Thorpe Edge is a housing estate in Idle, Bradford, West Yorkshire, England.

Geography and administration
Thorpe Edge is situated off Harrogate Road in the north-east of the City of Bradford and borders Idle and Five Lane Ends, Greengates and Eccleshill.

History

The estate was mostly constructed in the 1950s.  It was constructed mostly of low-rise housing but with two high-rise developments; the York Place flats and the Fairhaven Green flats.  All of the high-rise flats are eight-storeys in height and still standing, the larger York House has shops on the ground floor.  Some mid-rise flats were also constructed along the Northern edge of the estate.  These were demolished in the 2010s.  Some of the older low-rise houses were demolished in the 2000s.

Amenities
The estate has a church; St John the Divine on Idlethorp Way, a school; Parkland Primary School and shops on the ground floor of York House.  The estate is surrounded by areas with a greater number of amenities and there is a large Sainsbury's supermarket nearby at Greengates.

References

External links 

 Telegraph and Argus photograph collection

Areas of Bradford
Housing estates in England